Henry Fenwick may refer to:
 Henry Fenwick (MP for Sunderland) (1820–1868), British Liberal Party politician
 Henry Fenwick (MP for Houghton-le-Spring) (1863–1939), British army officer and Liberal Party politician